CrazyGames is a Belgian gaming platform that specializes in online games that can be played in the browser. The platform has about 7000 games available across a variety of genres and categories, ranging from action to puzzle and sports games, as well as solo or multiplayer games. CrazyGames was founded by brothers Raf and Tomas Mertens in 2014 and it has headquarters in Leuven, Belgium. Since then, it has grown into a company with 15 employees and offers games by more than 750 game developers.

The website focuses on games for children teenagers and adults. The platform has between 17 to 34 million visitors per month, making it one of the ten largest free browser gaming platforms worldwide. While the primary focus is on the English-speaking market, the platform also offers quite a few localized versions (23 in total). In 2018,  CrazyGames.com was the fourth most blocked website in American schools.

The platform allows game developers to publish and monetize HTML5 games that may or may not use the technology WebGL.

History 
Brothers Raf and Tomas Mertens founded CrazyGames in 2014 as a hobby project. In 2015, Tomas Mertens left the company to focus on other projects. In 2017, the company joined the incubator start it @KBC. The website grew rapidly and reached the 5 million unique users mark.

In October 2018, a prototype developer platform was launched. With this, the company wanted to build a developer community and provide game developers with an initial audience for their games. With the platform, developers can upload their games themselves on CrazyGames.

In November 2018, CrazyGames was nominated as one of the ten rising stars by Deloitte Belgium. The Rising Star competition is part of the Deloitte Technology Fast 50 competition, an annual selection of the 50 fastest growing and innovative technology companies. they also created ships 3d battleship multiplayer game

In 2019, CrazyGames ranked in position 7 of Deloitte's 2019 Fast 50 ranking with a growth rate of 1216.09%. One year later, in 2020, the company moved up to position 4 with a growth rate of 1.667.75%. They were also nominated and ranked in the Deloitte Fast 50 in 2021.

References

External links 
 Official website

Gaming websites
Browser-based game websites